Raising Buchanan is a 2019 American comedy film produced by Amanda Melby, Joe Gruberman, Chadwick Struck and Cathy Shim, written and directed by Bruce Dellis. The film stars René Auberjonois in the role of the title character, James Buchanan, the 15th president of the United States, and was his final role released in his lifetime. He died in December, 2019. The film was Bruce Dellis' first full-length feature. Raising Buchanan was filmed in and near Phoenix, Arizona.

Plot
Ruth Kiesling (Amanda Melby) is a 39-year-old woman with anger issues and a history of making poor decisions. Ruth sees an opportunity to turn her life around by stealing the body of dead president James Buchanan (René Auberjonois) to hold for ransom. However, she quickly learns that no one is particularly interested in getting him back.

Cast

 René Auberjonois as U.S. President James Buchanan
 Amanda Melby as Ruth Kiesling
 Cathy Shim as Meg
 Terence Bernie Hines as Phillip Crosby
 M. Emmet Walsh as Larry Kiesling
 Robert Ben Garant as Lancaster Guy
 Jennifer Pfalzgraff as Holly
 Steve Briscoe as Errol
 Shannon Whirry as Parnella Monroe
 Lynnette Brown as Gretchen
 Max Bullis as Dante
 Zoey Yeoman as Capt. Jarvis
 Shelly Boucher as Trina
 Laura Durant as Mrs. Warren
 Kane Black as Brock
 John Batchan as Wyatt
 Bruce Nelson as Det. Hostetler
 Saylor Billings as Biker Chick Vent
 Dustin Leighton as Sideburn Vent
 Dirk Fenstermacher, Jr. as TopKnot Vent
 Ted Raymond as Elderly Man
 Kyle Sorrell as Worried Man
 Howie Johnson as Charming Cell Phone Man

Production

Dellis shot the film on location in Phoenix, Scottsdale, Mesa, Tempe, Prescott and Paradise Valley, Arizona. He used an Arizona-based crew and nearly all of the actors were based in Arizona, with the exception of some key talent: Auberjonois, Walsh, Shim, Hines and Garant.

Originally, actor/comedian Andy Dick was slated to play the part of Lancaster Guy, but performance issues and allegations of sexual improprieties caused his firing the day after his scene was shot. The scene was subsequently re-shot using Robert Ben Garant in the role of Lancaster Guy.

Soundtrack
Several songs on the soundtrack concern mining disasters.
 "All This Could Be Yours" (written and performed by Jennifer Trynin)
 "Game of Pricks" (written by Robert Pollard; performed by Guided By Voices)
 "Timothy" (written by Rupert Holmes; performed by The Buoys)
 "Last Day in the Mine" (written by Jimmy Key; performed by Dave Dudley)
 "Explosion in the Fairmont Mine" (written and performed by Blind Alfred Reed)
 "McBeth Mine Explosion" (performed by Cap, Andy, and Flip)
 "Close the Coalhouse Door" (written and performed by Alex Glasgow)
 "Bow Wow" (written by Benjamin Darvill and J. Hogarth; performed by Son of Dave)
 "Cello Sonata No. 1, Op 38" (written by Johannes Brahms; performed by Amanda Melby)
 "Sonata Amanda, 3. Andante" (written by Douglas Durant; performed by Amanda Melby)

Accolades

References

External links

 

2019 films
2010s buddy films
2019 independent films
American comedy films
Films about presidents of the United States
Cultural depictions of James Buchanan
American buddy films
American independent films
Fictional characters from Arizona
Films shot in Arizona
2010s English-language films
2010s American films